The men's 200 metre butterfly event at the 2010 Asian Games took place on 13 November 2010 at Guangzhou Aoti Aquatics Centre.

There were 17 competitors from 12 countries who took part in this event. Three heats were held. The heat in which a swimmer competed did not formally matter for advancement, as the swimmers with the top eight times from the entire field qualified for the finals.

Japan finished one-two in this event, Takeshi Matsuda and Ryusuke Sakata won the gold and silver medal respectively. Chen Yin from China won the bronze medal, defending champion Wu Peng only finished fourth.

Schedule
All times are China Standard Time (UTC+08:00)

Records

Results

Heats

Final

References
 16th Asian Games Results

External links 
 Men's 200m Butterfly Heats Official Website
 Men's 200m Butterfly Ev.No.5 Final Official Website

Swimming at the 2010 Asian Games